Thomas H. Bender (born 1944) is an American historian, specializing in urban history and intellectual history. He joined New York University in 1974 and served there as University Professor of the Humanities from 1982 until his retirement in May 2015. He contributes regularly to the press, with articles published in The New York Times, The Nation, Los Angeles Times, Chronicle of Higher Education, and Newsday, among others.

Biography
He graduated from Santa Clara University with a B.A. (1966) and the University of California, Davis with an M.A. (1967) and a Ph.D. (1971). He taught Urban Studies and History for three years at the University of Wisconsin–Green Bay from 1971 before moving to New York University. During his tenure there, he was Chair at the Department of History from 1986 to 1989, and Dean for the Humanities from 1995 to 1998.

He moderated an online discussion at History Matters.

Awards
 1974 Frederick Jackson Turner Award

Selected works

References

1944 births
Santa Clara University alumni
University of California, Davis alumni
New York University faculty
Living people
21st-century American historians
21st-century American male writers
American male non-fiction writers
University of Wisconsin–Green Bay faculty